Phosphofurin acidic cluster sorting protein 1, also known as PACS-1, is a protein that in humans is encoded by the PACS1 gene.

Function 

The PACS-1 protein has a putative role in the localization of trans-Golgi network (TGN) membrane proteins. Mouse and rat homologs have been identified and studies of the homologous rat protein indicate a role in directing TGN localization of furin by binding to the protease's phosphorylated cytosolic domain. In addition, the human protein plays a role in HIV-1 Nef-mediated downregulation of cell surface MHC-I molecules to the TGN, thereby enabling HIV-1 to escape immune surveillance.

Interactions 

PACS1 has been shown to interact with Furin.

Clinical significance 
A de novo mutation c.607C>T in the PACS1 gene has been shown to result in a syndromic phenotype (colloquially called PACS1 Syndrome) that is characterized by global developmental delay, intellectual disability, and specific facial features.

Prevalence and diagnosis 

The first two cases were identified in early 2011 by doctors in the Netherlands. As of late 2014, there were 20 cases identified worldwide.

Diagnosis is typically done using full genome or exome sequencing.  There are likely several more cases that will eventually be reported as knowledge of the mutation spreads and testing becomes more accessible.

Observed and reported traits 
Individuals with the mutation have been reported to have similar facial features, such as:

 Widely spaced eyes and low-set ears
 Down-slanting eye corners and mild uni-brow
 Highly arched eyebrows and long eyelashes
 Rounded “button” nose with a flat bridge
 Wide mouth with down-turned corners
 Thin upper lip and widely spaced teeth

Other common traits reported by care givers of affected individuals are:

 Low muscle tone 
 Seizures 
 Repetitive self-stimulatory behavior 
 Sensory processing disorder 
 Delayed development of gross motor skills and fine motor skills
 Delayed cognitive development
 Chewing and swallowing difficulties
 Digestion or bowel problems
 Slow growth resulting in below average height and weight

Prognosis and treatment 

In combination, these traits affect walking, talking, feeding, and learning skills. No impact on life expectancy has been found. As with many developmental disabilities, there is no "cure".

In order to improve quality of life and enhance life skills of affected individuals, care givers have found a number of tools and strategies. It is important to note that all of these may not be applicable to a particular individual, and reported effectiveness has varied. It is recommended to consult with a physician prior to initiating any form of treatment.

 physiotherapy (PT)
 occupational therapy (OT)
 speech therapy (including augmentative and alternative communication) (SPT)
 behavioural therapy (applied behavior analysis/intensive behavioural intervention etc.)
 discrete trial teaching
 early intervention programs
 massage therapy and pediatric massage
 feeding therapy
 music therapy
 hippotherapy
 hydrotherapy

References

Further reading